The Best Horror of the Year is a series of horror fiction anthologies edited by Ellen Datlow. The series is published by Night Shade Books.
The format of the series is a collection of horror stories that vary in topic, contributed by multiple authors. A new volume has been released yearly since 2009.

Volumes
 The Best Horror of the Year: Volume One (2009)
 The Best Horror of the Year: Volume Two (2010)
 The Best Horror of the Year: Volume Three (2011)
 The Best Horror of the Year: Volume Four (2012)
 The Best Horror of the Year: Volume Five (2013)
 The Best Horror of the Year: Volume Six (2014)
 The Best Horror of the Year: Volume Seven (2015)
 The Best Horror of the Year: Volume Eight (2016)
 The Best Horror of the Year: Volume Nine (2017)
 The Best Horror of the Year: Volume Ten (2018)
 The Best Horror of the Year: Volume Eleven (2019)
 The Best Horror of the Year: Volume Twelve (2020)

References

External links
 

Horror anthologies